is a Japanese manga series written and illustrated by Kamimura Sumiko. It was serialized in Kodansha's Monthly Shōnen Magazine from 1986 to 1988. Because of the sexual content the series was one of the manga placed on "Harmful manga" lists by local and national governmental agencies. The negative publicity resulted in Kodansha discontinuing the series.

In 2014 a live-action version of the manga, starring Mikuru Uchino, Aimi Yoshikawa and Megu Fujiura, was produced by SPO Entertainment.

Volume list

References

1986 manga
Japanese direct-to-video films
Shōnen manga
Kodansha manga
Manga adapted into films